The 1952 Cincinnati Reds season was the franchise's 63rd year as a member of the National League and its 71st consecutive year of operation in Major League Baseball. The Reds won 69 games, lost 85, and finished sixth, drawing 604,197 spectators to Crosley Field, next-to-last in the eight-team league.

Offseason 
 October 4, 1951: Johnny Pramesa and Bob Usher were traded by the Reds to the Chicago Cubs for Smoky Burgess and Bob Borkowski.
 October 14, 1951: Jim Bolger was traded by the Reds to the Buffalo Bisons for Tom Acker and Moe Savransky.
 December 10, 1951: Smoky Burgess, Howie Fox and Connie Ryan were traded by the Reds to the Philadelphia Phillies for Andy Seminick, Eddie Pellagrini, Dick Sisler, and Niles Jordan.
 Prior to 1952 season: Charlie Rabe was signed as an amateur free agent by the Reds.

Regular season 
 July 29, 1952: Manager Luke Sewell, in his third full year at the helm, is fired with Cincinnati 39–59 (.398) and in seventh place, 26 games out of the league lead. Coach Earle Brucker Sr. takes control as interim manager and the Reds win three of five decisions under him.
 August 5, 1952: Baseball Hall of Fame batsman Rogers Hornsby, 56, is named permanent manager. He leads the Reds to a 27–24 (.529) record for the remainder of the year, enabling them to climb to sixth place.

Season standings

Record vs. opponents

Notable transactions 
 May 13, 1952: Dick Sisler and Virgil Stallcup were traded by the Reds to the St. Louis Cardinals for Eddie Kazak and Wally Westlake.
 May 23, 1952: Kent Peterson and Johnny Wyrostek were traded by the Reds to the Philadelphia Phillies for Bubba Church.
 August 7, 1952: Wally Westlake was purchased from the Reds by the Cleveland Indians.
 August 28, 1952: Ewell Blackwell was traded by the Reds to the New York Yankees for Jim Greengrass, Bob Marquis, Ernie Nevel, Johnny Schmitz and $35,000.

Roster

Player stats

Batting

Starters by position 
Note: Pos = Position; G = Games played; AB = At bats; H = Hits; Avg. = Batting average; HR = Home runs; RBI = Runs batted in

Other batters 
Note: G = Games played; AB = At bats; H = Hits; Avg. = Batting average; HR = Home runs; RBI = Runs batted in

Pitching

Starting pitchers 
Note: G = Games pitched; IP = Innings pitched; W = Wins; L = Losses; ERA = Earned run average; SO = Strikeouts

Other pitchers 
Note: G = Games pitched; IP = Innings pitched; W = Wins; L = Losses; ERA = Earned run average; SO = Strikeouts

Relief pitchers 
Note: G = Games pitched; W = Wins; L = Losses; SV = Saves; ERA = Earned run average; SO = Strikeouts

Farm system

References

External links
1952 Cincinnati Reds season at Baseball Reference

Cincinnati Reds seasons
Cincinnati Reds season
Cincinnati Reds